The 1963–64 season was Colchester United's 22nd season in their history and their second successive season in the Third Division, the third tier of English football. Alongside competing in the Third Division, the club also participated in the FA Cup and the League Cup.

A mid-season managerial change saw Benny Fenton leave for Leyton Orient and ex-England international Neil Franklin arrive from APOEL. They finished the season in 17th-place and had a good run in the League Cup, seeing off First Division Fulham in the first round, and then Second Division Northampton Town in the second round, before being knocked out in the third round by Fourth Division side Workington. Colchester made the second round of the FA Cup but were beaten by Queens Park Rangers.

Season overview
The 1963–64 season proved to be one of change for Colchester United. Benny Fenton left the club to take over at Second Division Leyton Orient in September. Incoming was former England international Neil Franklin, who had been managing APOEL in Cyprus. Franklin's first piece of business was the sale of prolific forward Bobby Hunt to Northampton Town for £18,000. Hunt's 23 goals scored by the end of February was not surpassed despite his exit as Colchester finished the season in a disappointing 17th–position.

Colchester had an impressive run in the League Cup, seeing off Fulham of the First Division 5–3 in the first round, before beating Northampton in the second round but falling to defeat against Workington in the third. They beat Brighton & Hove Albion in the first round of the FA Cup, but were defeated in the second by Queens Park Rangers.

Players

Transfers

In

Out

 Total incoming:  ~ £18,000

Match details

Friendlies

Third Division

Results round by round

League table

Matches

League Cup

FA Cup

Squad statistics

Appearances and goals

|-
!colspan="14"|Players who appeared for Colchester who left during the season

|}

Goalscorers

Disciplinary record

Clean sheets
Number of games goalkeepers kept a clean sheet.

Player debuts
Players making their first-team Colchester United debut in a fully competitive match.

See also
List of Colchester United F.C. seasons

References

General
Books

Websites

Specific

1963-64
English football clubs 1963–64 season